Edoardo Candiago (born 6 August 1978) is an Italian rugby union player. He plays as a flanker. 

He played more recently for Rugby Calvisano (2004/05-2005/06), Venezia Mestre Rugby FC (2007/08-2009/10) and for Mogliano, since 2010/11.

References

External links
Venezia Mestre rugby profile

1978 births
Living people
Italian rugby union players
Rugby Calvisano players
Venezia Mestre Rugby FC players
Mogliano Rugby players